Kowloon Dairy Limited is a dairy producer in Hong Kong. It was established by George Ahwee and Rudy Choy in 1940.

History
The Kowloon Dairy was incorporated on 21 March 1940. Initially there were only 30 employees and the company could only supply fresh milk to the northern part of the Kowloon Peninsula. The company expanded following additional investment by Li Lan Sang. During World War II, the company had 100 cows, all of which were taken through plundering.

In the early years, the Kowloon Dairy Limited's factory was located where the Choi Wan Estate is presently situated. In 1972, the Hong Kong government decided to reclaim the land in order to build public estates for its citizens and Kowloon Dairy decided to move its factory to Tuen Mun and the Farm to Yuen Long. The farm expanded to 21,000 square foot with more than 300 cows.

Since about 1975, the Kowloon Dairy’s operation and business are managed by the family of Li Lan Sang.

In 2013, there were almost 500 employees working for the Kowloon Dairy Limited, with distribution across Hong Kong and Macau. At that time the company was producing different varieties of dairy products, including milk and ice cream. In 1992, Kowloon Dairy Limited entered the Chinese market and formed a joint company named the Kowloon Dairy (Guangzhou) Limited with local dairy company Fengxing Milk. Production in China started in 1994; now, dairy products from Kowloon Dairy Limited can be found in Guangdong, Hainan, Fujian, Heilongjiang and Yunnan.

The Southern Metropolis Daily said of Kowloon Dairy, "many Hong Kong people drink it from childhood to adulthood and are loyal fans of it".

Award

In January 2007 and 2009, Kowloon Dairy Limited was awarded certification from HACCP Food Safety Management and the ISO 22000 Certification by the British Standards Institution. This was the first time a Hong Kong Dairy Product company was recognized and awarded. Furthermore, in September 2011, Kowloon Dairy Limited was granted HACCP Food Safety Management and ISO 22000 Certification from the SGS.

See also
 Dairy Farm International Holdings Limited
 List of food companies
 Trappist Dairy (Hong Kong) Limited
 The Garden Company
 Manufacturing in Hong Kong

References

External links

 Kowloon Dairy

Drink companies of Hong Kong
Dairy products companies of Hong Kong
Ice cream brands
1940 establishments in Hong Kong
Food and drink companies established in 1940